Warriors is the ninth full-length studio album from New York hardcore band Agnostic Front released on November 6, 2007.
The album is produced by Madball frontman Freddy Cricien, who is the half-brother of Agnostic Front frontman Roger Miret.

Track listing

References

External links
Agnostic Front official website
kvltsite.com review

2007 albums
Agnostic Front albums
Albums produced by Chris "Zeuss" Harris